The Gawad Urian for Best Film, (officially, the Pinakamahusay na Pelikula) is an award given by the Manunuri ng Pelikulang Pilipino (Filipino Film Critics) to the best Filipino film of the year.

Winners and nominees

1970s

1980s

1990s

2000s

2010s

2020s

References

External links

Gawad Urian Awards
Philippine film awards
Awards for best film